The Last Snow (Persian: برف آخر, romanized: Barfe Akhar) is a 2022 Iranian drama film directed by Amir Hossein Asgari and written by Asgari, Amir Mohammad Abdi and Hassan Hosseini. The film screened for the first time at the 40th Fajr Film Festival and received 4 awards and earned 9 nominations.

Premise 
Yousef is a successful and committed veterinarian who lives in a village. The film revolves around the disappearance of the daughter of Yousef's friend, Khalil, whose name is Khorshid. It is not clear what exactly happened to Khorshid, all the members of the village look for her sympathetically until a secret is revealed.

Cast 

 Amin Hayai as Yousef
 Ladan Mostofi as Rana
 Majid Salehi as Khalil
 Nooshin Masoudian
 Mohammad Sadegh Malek
 Amir Mashhadi Abbas
 Amir Abbas Roudgar Safari
 Mehdi Mehraban

Reception

Critical response

Accolades

References

External links 

 

2020s Persian-language films
2022 drama films
2022 films
Iranian drama films